Khalid (Arabic: خَالِد khālid) is a common ِArabic masculine given name in many Arab and Asian countries, which means "eternal, everlasting, immortal".

Khalid may also refer to:

 Khalid ibn al-Walid, a seventh century military leader
 Bani Khalid, an Arab tribal confederation of eastern and central Arabia
 Al-Khalid tank, a Pakistani tank
 Khalid, a character from the Baldur's Gate video games
 Khalid (singer), a singer and songwriter based in El Paso, Texas

See also  

 Khaled (disambiguation)